The Saura Purana is one of the Shaiva Upapuranas, a genre of Hindu religious texts. The printed editions of this text have 69 chapters (adhyāyas). The extant Saura Purana describes itself as a supplement (khila) to the Brahma Purana which consisting of two Samhitas with the first being dictated by Sanatkumara and the second by Surya to Vaivasvata Manu. It is presumed that an earlier version of this text different from the extant one existed but has since been lost.

Content 
The extant Saura Purana, though proclaimed by Surya, eulogises Shiva and his shakti Parvati. This text praises Varanasi and describes its various sacred places and lingas. It consists of a version of the narrative of Urvasi and Pururavas in chapter 31. It also deals with Devi worship, merits of dānas (donations), vratas (vows) and brief descriptions of the Puranas. Chapters 38-40 contain attacks on Madhvacharya, an early medieval philosopher and his works in the form of a prophecy.In Chapter 61 the gods invoke ''Agni' in a very beautiful stuti (or praise).

Printed editions 
The early printed editions of this text published by the Anandashrama (Anandashrama Sanskrit Series 18), Pune in 1889 and the Vangavasi Press, Calcutta in 1908 (along with a Bengali translation) are practically identical.

References

Bibliography

External links 
 

Puranas
Shaiva texts
Surya